The 2000–01 Slovenian Ice Hockey League was the 10th season of the Slovenian Hockey League. Olimpija won the league championships.

First round

Final round

Play-offs

Finals
13 March 2001: Jesenice – Olimpija : 1–3 (0–1, 1–1, 0–1)
15 March 2001: Olimpija – Jesenice: 4–1 (0–0, 1–1, 3–0)
17 March 2001: Jesenice – Olimpija : 5–3 (1–2, 2–1, 2–0)
20 March 2001: Olimpija – Jesenice: 6–3 (2–2, 2–0, 2–1)
21 March 2001: Jesenice – Olimpija : 2–4 (1–2, 1–1, 0–1)

3rd place
13 March 2001: Slavija – Kranjska Gora: 10–5 (3–1, 3–2, 4–2)
15 March 2001: Kranjska Gora – Slavija : 5–8 (2–2, 2–1, 1–5)
17 March 2001: Slavija – Kranjska Gora: 2–0 (0–0, 1–0, 1–0)

5th place

External links
Championnat de Slovénie 2000–01

1
Slovenia
Slovenian Ice Hockey League seasons